Cartwright Long Range Radar Site (LAB-6) is a Royal Canadian Air Force Long Range Radar Site located  east-northeast of CFB Goose Bay, Newfoundland and Labrador.

Facilities 
The facility contains a long range, phased array AN/FPS-117 3-dimensional air search surveillance radar that was installed in November 1998 as part of the North Warning System. The site (LAB-6) also consists of radar towers, communications facility, and storage and tunnel connected buildings for personnel.

History
It was used initially by the Northeast Air Command, which stationed the 922d Aircraft Control and Warning Squadron on the station on 1 October 1953. The station functioned as a Ground-Control Intercept (GCI) and warning station as part of the Pinetree Line.

See also
 North Warning System
 Pinetree Line

References

External links
About NORAD Public information
Radar Information AN/FPS-117 Radar information from FAS
Technical Radar Information AN/FPS-124 Radar information from FAS

Military installations in Newfoundland and Labrador
Royal Canadian Air Force stations
Canadian Forces bases in Newfoundland and Labrador